The Third Michigan Territorial Council was a meeting of the legislative body governing Michigan Territory, known formally as the Legislative Council of the Territory of Michigan. The council met in Detroit in two regular sessions between May 5, 1828, and November 5, 1829, during the term of Lewis Cass as territorial governor.

Leadership and organization 

Abraham Edwards was president of the council; John P. Sheldon, Samuel Satterlee, and Seneca Allen clerks; and William Meldrum sergeant-at-arms.

Members 

A January 1827 act of the United States Congress provided for the direct election of a 13-member legislative council by the people of the territory; the same act gave the council responsibility for determining the apportionment of seats. 
On April 13, the council passed an act requiring the executive of the territory to determine the apportionment of seats based on a census.
Governor Cass issued a proclamation on September 3, 1827, setting out the results:

Notes

References 
 
 
 
 

003
1828 in Michigan Territory
1829 in Michigan Territory
Michigan
Michigan